The Samsung SGH-A177 is a candy bar style mobile phone manufactured by Samsung.

References

Samsung mobile phones
Mobile phones introduced in 2009